Casalvieri is a comune (municipality) in the Province of Frosinone in the Italian region Lazio, located about  southeast of Rome and about  east of Frosinone.

Casalvieri borders the following municipalities: Alvito, Arpino, Atina, Casalattico, Fontechiari, Vicalvi.

References

External links
 Official website

Cities and towns in Lazio